The 2014–15 FA Cup Fourth Round match between Chelsea and Bradford City was played on 24 January 2015 at Stamford Bridge in West London. The match is considered not only one of the biggest FA Cup upsets in history, but also one of the most dramatic comebacks in the history of the competition, with Bradford City being 2-1 down at half time. In December 2019 readers of Bradford-based newspaper Telegraph & Argus voted it Bradford City's best match of the 2010s.

Chelsea were leading 2–1 at half-time with goals from Gary Cahill and Ramires. However, in the second half Bradford City staged a comeback as Filipe Morais, Andy Halliday, and Mark Yeates each scored a goal (including one in stoppage time) to help Bradford City win the game 2–4, thus allowing the Bantams to reach the Fifth Round of the FA Cup for the first time in 18 years. It also ended Chelsea's hopes of winning a quadruple that season. The match became Chelsea's first home loss that season, and the first time they had conceded three goals at home to a lower division side in the FA Cup since their 1991 Third Round match against Oxford United.

At the time, Chelsea were at the top of the table in the Premier League and Bradford City were 6th in League One, meaning there were 49 places between the two clubs. Bradford City entered the competition in the First Round and went through to the Fourth Round after winning a replay against Millwall 4–0 at home.

The 2014–15 FA Cup Fourth Round is known as one of the most eventful in recent times. Only one of the "big six" teams in England won at the first attempt which was Arsenal who beat Championship side Brighton & Hove Albion away 3–2. Arsenal went on to win the competition. On that same day, defending Premier League champions Manchester City also lost their Fourth Round match at home by a margin of 2 against Championship side, Middlesbrough. Tottenham were beaten at home by struggling Leicester City. Manchester United and Liverpool had been held to 0–0 draws with League Two Cambridge United and Championship Bolton Wanderers respectively, forcing replays (which they won 3–0 and 2–1 respectively).

Background 

At the time, Chelsea were comfortably sitting at the top of the Premier League table, 5 points ahead of eventual runners-up Manchester City. They had also finished at the top of their UEFA Champions League group stage and were in the semi-finals of the Football League Cup. Conversely, Bradford City were in their second-consecutive season in League One, after winning the 2013 Football League Two play-off Final against Northampton Town. Bradford City's Portuguese winger, Filipe Morais joined Chelsea's academy in 2003 when he was 16. While José Mourinho was at his first stint as Chelsea manager, he promoted Morais to the first team at the start of the 2005–06 season, but he did not make any appearances as he was loaned out to MK Dons for most of the season. Billy Knott also spent time in Chelsea's academy, from 2007 to 2010, before transferring to Sunderland.

During a press conference before the match José Mourinho said that if they were to lose to Bradford City that afternoon, it will be a "big disgrace" due to the fact that the Blues were one of the stronger sides in England at the time.

Route to the match

Match 
Chelsea took the lead in the 21st minute, when Gary Cahill volleyed the ball into the net from a corner taken by Oscar. Chelsea dominated possession until their next goal, which came in the 38th minute, after Ramires ran through the Bradford defence. Two minutes later, Bradford scored from a free kick; the ball was passed from Morais to Andrew Davies and then to Jon Stead, who scored to make the score 2-1.

The early second half was marked by a number of chances for both teams. Jose Mourinho brought on Willian for Mohamed Salah and Cesc Fàbregas for John Obi Mikel, who had suffered a head injury. Morais scored an unexpected equaliser in the 75th minute from a throw-in to bring the game to 2-2. Loïc Rémy was immediately substituted for Eden Hazard, but sustained Chelsea dominance failed to produce a goal. Phil Parkinson made his first substitution in the 80th minute, taking off Billy Knott for Mark Yeates. Two minutes later, Andy Halliday scored to put Bradford in front. Chelsea were unable to score during seven minutes of stoppage time, while Yeates chipped the ball over Petr Čech in the 94th minute to secure a famous victory for Bradford.

Details

Post-match 

Immediately following the full-time whistle, the Bradford City players ran straight for the stand with the away supporters to celebrate their unlikely victory. Chelsea manager, José Mourinho clapped in respect and walked into the tunnel with the team's substitutes. After the game, he went into Bradford City's dressing room and shook the hands of Parkinson, Bradford City's staff, and all of the players, congratulating them for their performance. Bradford City goalkeeper, Ben Williams, described Mourinho as "classy and humble" when he walked into their dressing room.

Mourinho described the match as surprising and incredible, and that their comeback was one of the things that makes football and the magic of the FA Cup so special. However, he is very disappointed with his team's performance and committed to his words before the press conference and considered the result a "disgrace" on both his record and Chelsea's record.

Bradford City manager, Phil Parkinson described the moment as "surreal" and was very impressed with his players due to the result of the match. He also said that this win against Chelsea was much more impressive than their run to the 2013 Football League Cup Final, where they beat the likes of Arsenal, Aston Villa, and Wigan Athletic, all of whom were in the Premier League at the time. They did however, lose that final 5–0 to Swansea City. Billy Knott also thought that the game was impressive and said that it was the "greatest moment of his career". Chelsea legend, John Terry, even gave him his shirt after the match, which he then gave to his dad, a Chelsea supporter. Terry also complimented James Hanson's performance. Filipe Morais stated that "bravery" played a huge role in staging their comeback against the Blues.

Aftermath 
The press and English football fans have dubbed the result as one of the most ridiculous upsets in the history of the competition. Especially when compared to other FA Cup matches like Manchester City's comeback against Tottenham Hotspur in 2004 or the 1988 FA Cup Final between Liverpool and Wimbledon. Former Liverpool player, Robbie Fowler, and former Tottenham player, Jermaine Jenas, described the game as "the greatest FA Cup upset", as the Bantams had "too many odds against them".  Bradford won the FA Cup Giant-Killing Award as a result, for the biggest FA Cup giant-killing of the season.

Bradford City 

Because of that win, Bradford City progressed to the Fifth Round, where they would play against another Premier League club, Sunderland. They won the game in their home stadium by a score of 2–0, and reached the Quarter-finals. They did not make a trip to Wembley Stadium though, as they lost 3–0 away to Reading after a replay, ending their FA Cup run. It was also their first quarter-final appearance in the FA Cup since the 1975–76 season. Bradford City would end up finishing 7th in League One, just narrowly missing out on the promotion play-offs by 4 points. They were not playing in any other competitions at the time, as they were knocked out of the EFL Trophy and EFL Cup back in September.

Chelsea 

Chelsea did not let that upset affect the rest of their season. Three days after the upset, they would win their second-leg tie against Liverpool in the EFL Cup semi-finals by a score of 1–0 thanks to an extra time goal by Branislav Ivanović, allowing them to win 2–1 on aggregate. They would then go on and win the final 2–0 against London rivals, Tottenham Hotspur. They would also stay first in the Premier League for the rest of the season, and secure their 5th English title with 3 games to spare, after a 1–0 win against Crystal Palace. However, their hopes of progressing past the Round of 16 in the UEFA Champions League ended after they tied the second leg 2–2 at the Bridge, bringing the aggregate score to 3–3, allowing Paris Saint-Germain to go to the next round on away goals. Bradford were the only away side to win at Chelsea all season.

See also 

 Newcastle United F.C. 0–1 Crystal Palace F.C. (1907)
 Hereford United 2–1 Newcastle United
 Sutton United 2–1 Coventry City (1989)
 Wrexham A.F.C. 2–1 Arsenal F.C.
 Norwich City F.C. 0–1 Luton Town F.C.
 Burnley F.C. 0–1 Lincoln City F.C. (2017)

References

External links 
 Official Match Highlights — The Football Association
 BBC Sport Match Report — BBC Sport

2014–15 FA Cup
FA Cup matches
Bradford City
Bradford City A.F.C. matches
January 2015 sports events in the United Kingdom
2015 sports events in London